Fouquereuil is a commune in the Pas-de-Calais department in the Hauts-de-France region of France.

Geography
The A26 autoroute passes by, just yards from the commune.

Population

Places of interest
 The church of St. Nicolas, dating from the nineteenth century.
 An old mill.
 The Commonwealth War Graves Commission cemetery.

See also
 Communes of the Pas-de-Calais department

References

External links

 Sandpits CWGC cemetery

Communes of Pas-de-Calais